Kirovske (Kirovskoye) (until 1944, İslâm Terek) is an urban-type settlement in the Crimea, a territory recognized by a majority of countries as part of Ukraine and incorporated by Russia as the Republic of Crimea. Population: 

Kirovske (Kirovskoye) also serves as the administrative center of the Kirovske Raion (district), housing the district's local administration buildings.

A military air base, Kirovske, is located south of the town.  It was used extensively by Soviet Naval Aviation and Soviet Air Defense Forces during the Cold War.

As of the 2001 Ukrainian Census, its population was 7,431.

References

Urban-type settlements in Crimea
Kirovske Raion